This is a list of diplomatic missions in Kuwait. There are currently 112 embassies in Kuwait City (not including honorary consulates).

Embassies in Kuwait City

Other posts in Kuwait City 
 (Representative Office)
 (Taipei Commercial Representative Office)
 (Delegation)

Non-resident embassies

Former Embassy
 (closed in 2019)

See also 
 List of diplomatic missions of Kuwait
 Ministry of Foreign Affairs (Kuwait)
 Foreign relations of Kuwait
 Visa requirements for Kuwaiti citizens

References

External links 
  Ministry of Foreign Affairs of Kuwait

Diplomatic missions
Kuwait